Elise Mertens was the defending champion, but lost in the second round to Yulia Putintseva.

Aryna Sabalenka won the title, defeating Petra Kvitová in the final, 6–3, 6–3.

Seeds
The top eight seeds who played received a bye into the second round.

Draw

Finals

Top half

Section 1

Section 2

Bottom half

Section 3

Section 4

Qualifying

Seeds

Qualifiers

Lucky losers

Draw

First qualifier

Second qualifier

Third qualifier

Fourth qualifier

Fifth qualifier

Sixth qualifier

Seventh qualifier

Eighth qualifier

References

External links
Main Draw
Qualifying Draw

2020 WTA Tour
2020 Singles
2020 in Qatari sport